Salix mesnyi is a species of willow native to southern and eastern China (Jiangxi, Zhejiang, Anhui, Jiangsu, Fujian, Guangdong, Guangxi), Taiwan, and Vietnam.

Description

The bark is grey, and the leaves are ovate with serrated edges. The back of the leaves is also, like the bark, grey.

Flowers
Salix mesnyi is a dioecious plant. Blooming in early spring, female flowers are green and male flowers are yellow. The flowers are without petals, calyx, only stamens or pistils longer than calyx-like bracts. Male flowers, catkins, are about 4–8 cm, containing 4-7 stamens, anthers conspicuously yellow, filaments basally hairy, surrounded by yellow glands. While the female spike length of about 3–6 cm, with bracts long ovary stalk, spindle-shaped ovary which has 6–10 ovules, short style on the split 4 petals into a cross, ovary at the bottom of only one gland body.

Fruits
Capsule is spindle type, fruit length is 7–12 cm, seeds are fluffy.

References

mesnyi
Flora of China
Flora of Taiwan
Flora of Vietnam
Plants described in 1882